Cemil Usta (10 April 1951 – 5 March 2003) was a Turkish football player who played as a leftback. A one-club man, Usta solely represented Trabzonspor at a senior level and was a long-time captain of the team in their golden age. Usta twice represented the Turkey national football team. Usta was nicknamed Dozer (Turkish for bulldozer).

Death
On 15 March 2003, Usta died from a heart attack in his hometown Trabzon. On 20 August 2008, Trabzonspor named their oldest training facility Usta. On 14 November 2009, a forest in the Zigana Pass was named after him. The 2019–20 Süper Lig season was officially named Spor Toto Süper Lig Cemil Usta season after him.

Honours
Trabzonspor
Süper Lig (4): 1975–76, 1976–77, 1978–79, 1979–80
Turkish Cup (3): 1976–77, 1977–78
Turkish Super Cup (4): 1977, 1978, 1979, 1980
Prime Minister's Cup (2): 1976, 1978

References

External links
 
 
 NFT Profile

1951 births
2003 deaths
Sportspeople from Trabzon
Turkish footballers
Turkey international footballers
Trabzonspor footballers
Süper Lig players
Association football fullbacks